Jean Gilles may refer to:
Jean Gilles (composer) (1668–1705), French composer
Jean Gilles (French Army officer) (1904–1961), French Army general
Jean Villard Gilles (1895–1982), French Swiss chansonnier, comedian and actor